Saratovskaya is a rural locality (a stanitsa)  under the administrative jurisdiction of the Town of  Goryachy Klyuch of Krasnodar Krai, Russia. Population:

References

Rural localities in Krasnodar Krai